Clela Ann Rorex (July 23, 1943 – June 19, 2022) was an American county clerk who issued the first same-sex marriage license in the United States. Serving as the Boulder County Clerk, Rorex issued a marriage license to a gay couple in 1975 after receiving approval from the District Attorney.

Early life 
Clela Rorex was born in Denver on July 23, 1943, and raised in Steamboat Springs, Colorado. She was adopted at an early age by Ruby and Cecil Rorex who was the county clerk for Routt County, Colorado, for 30 years.

Education and early career 
Rorex attended the University of Colorado on a Methodist scholarship and earned a bachelor's degree. She later earned a second degree in legal administration from the University of Denver. She then married a naval officer and spent three years with him while he was stationed at Guantanamo Bay, Cuba, before returning to Boulder.

After working a few summers in her father's office, Rorex decided to run for county clerk of Boulder County, Colorado, when the incumbent, Henry Putnam, announced his retirement. She decided to run after attending a meeting in which members of the Democratic Party stated that they "needed a man" to run against the female Republican candidate. Rorex shared her frustrations over hearing this with women in a feminist group she was a member of, and decided that she would run for clerk. She was elected and took office in 1975 at age 31. Henry Putnam would not vacate the office and was removed by the sheriff's office.

Same-sex marriage licenses 
Rorex had been clerk for three months when two men, Dave McCord and Dave Zamora, came to the clerk's office to apply for a marriage license. They had originally applied in Colorado Springs, where they were told to go to Boulder; El Paso County did not do "that type of thing."

After Rorex inquired into the legality of issuing the license, District Attorney Alex Hunter and first assistant DA Bill Wise wrote an opinion stating that Colorado law did not specify whether marriage must be between a man and a woman. Rorex was told it was within her legal right to decide if she wanted to issue the license or not. Rorex issued the license on March 26, 1975. She issued five more same-sex marriage licenses in Boulder before the Colorado Attorney General ordered her to stop. She received hate mail and angry phone calls.

The Boulder County Courthouse was added to the National Register of Historic Places in part because of the marriage licenses Rorex issued. In June 2018, Boulder replaced an image of Roswell "Ross" Howard and his horse, Dolly, with a photo of Rorex. After Rorex issued same-sex marriage licenses, Howard showed up at the courthouse with Dolly and asked for a license to marry his horse. Rorex said she declined his request on the basis that his eight-year-old horse was underage, and could not marry without written consent from her parents.

Backlash 
Rorex resigned from office about two and a half years into her term. She married and moved to California. Rorex never held elected office again.

Later career 
Rorex returned to Colorado after her marriage and obtained a degree in legal administration from the University of Denver. She worked as a legal administrator for the Native American Rights Fund in Boulder for 18 years. After retiring around 2011, she spoke at public schools on panels composed of people of different gender identities. She considered herself an "ally for gay rights and marriage equality".

Personal life and death 
Rorex was married and divorced three times, and had three children. She died on June 19, 2022, at the age of 78 at a hospice care facility in Longmont, Colorado, from complications of an infection following surgery.

See also
 Hillary Hall—21st century Boulder County clerk known for issuing marriage licenses to same-sex couples

References 

1943 births
2022 deaths
20th-century American politicians
20th-century American women politicians
Colorado Democrats
County clerks in Colorado
Infectious disease deaths in Colorado
American LGBT rights activists
People from Steamboat Springs, Colorado
Politicians from Denver
Same-sex marriage in the United States
University of Colorado alumni
University of Denver alumni
Women in Colorado politics